Rig Expert Ukraine Ltd is a manufacturer of ham and PMR Two-way radio RF antenna analysis and antenna tuning equipment. The company was founded in 2003 and is headquartered in Kyiv, Ukraine.

Current products 
The AA-30, AA-54 & AA-170 are almost the same product except for the frequency range. Similarly, the AA-600, AA-1000 & AA-1400 are the same product except for the different frequency range.

See also

Antenna analyzer
Antenna tuner
Impedance matching

References

External links 

 Ukraine: 
 USA:  (website has been closed, May 2022)
 Canada: 
 UK: 

Electrical circuits
Radio electronics
Impedance measurements
Electronic test equipment manufacturers